Midland Public Schools is a public school district located in Midland, Michigan, United States.

History
The roots of Midland Public Schools go back to the 1872 Union High School, which educated local students until a boiler explosion destroyed the building in 1907. A new school was constructed the following year using a large donation from the local Dow Chemical Company. The institution was renamed Midland High School (MHS), and their nickname was “Chemics”. By the mid-1930s, the student population had grown and the second, larger MHS was built in 1937. The 1908 (first) MHS was used as an elementary school, then as the intermediate school until Northeast Intermediate was opened in 1950. Student populations climbed higher and a third MHS was completed in late 1955, larger than ever. For the 1956-57 school year, the high school moved to the new building and the 1937 (second) MHS became Central Intermediate, the second middle school in Midland. The 1908 (first) MHS was torn down in 1957. For the 1963-64 school year, Jefferson Intermediate was opened to handle children from the Post-World War II baby boom. Midland High School was overcrowded again, but the decision was made to build a second high school in Midland, less than ten years after the current MHS was completed. Herbert Henry Dow High School opened to sophomores in 1968, and added one grade each year until the first class graduated in 1971. A freshman class was added to high schools in 1997 and intermediate schools changed from grades 7-8-9 to 6-7-8; school names were changed from Intermediate to Middle School. Elementary schools gained classrooms when they lost grade 6.

Consolidation
As Michigan's economy worsened in 2009, the school board debated alternatives to reduce expenses in preparation for a $3–6 million reduction in state funding. Enrollment had been declining for several years to a point where the district's 12 elementary schools were below two-thirds capacity and several needed to be closed. Only one elementary school was projected to close for the 2009-2010 school year, but three more were planned for 2010-2011 when students zoned for Central Middle School would be sent to Jefferson and Northeast Middle Schools. Consolidation of the district's administrative offices was proposed, as well as relocation to a closed elementary school.

On December 15, 2009, the board elected to close five elementary schools beginning with the 2010-2011 school year. The schools chosen for closure were Chippewassee, Longview, Parkdale, Mills, and Cook. The majority of the students of these schools were moved to other elementary schools in the district.

Central Middle School was closed for instruction at the end of the 2012-13 school year, although the building was then actively used for entertainment, sporting and administrative purposes. Remaining students were moved to Jefferson and Northeast Middle Schools. The original building's auditorium was later renovated while most other parts of the building were demolished. In February 2016, plans were approved for a new STEM-focused elementary school to be built at the same location. The new school, Central Park Elementary, opened in September 2017.

Schools

Elementary schools

Middle schools

High schools

Demographics
As of 2006, Midland Public schools is 91.8% White, 2.8% Asian or Pacific Islander, 2.5% Black, 2.2% Hispanic, 0.5% American Indian and 0.2% Multi-Racial.

MPS-TV
The school district has its own community cable and IPTV Public-access television channel known as MPS-TV, which broadcasts on the Charter Communications cable network in the Midland area, and AT&T U-Verse TV network in the Tri-Cities region.  A broadcast schedule and additional information is available on the MPS-TV web site.

Athletic Facilities

High schools
Midland Community Stadium, which seats 7,500, is located next door to Midland High School, but is shared by both schools as their home field for football & soccer games and track meets. Dow High School has a field with limited seating and no lighting that is used primarily for daytime junior varsity contests. Dow High School has an indoor pool with spectator seating for 1,000 that is shared by both schools as their home pool.

References

External links

School districts in Michigan
Education in Midland County, Michigan
Midland, Michigan
1919 establishments in Michigan
School districts established in 1919